The Samavedis are an Indian community, originating from a group of classical musicians and dancers. They are Nayaks and Gayakas, believed to have been originated from Orissa, India.

Hindu communities
Social groups of Maharashtra